Strangea linearis is a shrub of the family Proteaceae native to eastern Australia.

References

Flora of Queensland
linearis
Plants described in 1855